Sergey Kalesnik (born January 28, 1970 in Gomel, Byelorussian SSR) is a Soviet-born Belarusian sprint canoeist who competed from the late 1980s to the late 1990s. He won six medals at the ICF Canoe Sprint World Championships with three golds (K-1 200 m: 1994, K-1 500 m: 1990, K-2 500 m: 1990) and three silvers (K-1 200 m: 1995, K-2 500 m: 1989, K-4 1000 m: 1990).

Kalesnik also competed in three Summer Olympics under three different nations. At the 1988 Summer Olympics in Seoul, he was eliminated in the semifinals of the K-2 1000 m event for the Soviet Union. Competing for the Unified Team at the 1992 Summer Olympics in Barcelona, Kalesnik finished fifth in the K-2 500 m and ninth in the K-2 1000 m events. Finally competing for Belarus at the 1996 Summer Olympics in Atlanta, Kalesnik was eliminated in the semifinal round of the K-1 500 m event.

References

External links

1970 births
Sportspeople from Gomel
Belarusian male canoeists
Canoeists at the 1988 Summer Olympics
Canoeists at the 1992 Summer Olympics
Canoeists at the 1996 Summer Olympics
Living people
Olympic canoeists of Belarus
Olympic canoeists of the Soviet Union
Olympic canoeists of the Unified Team
Soviet male canoeists
ICF Canoe Sprint World Championships medalists in kayak
Honoured Masters of Sport of the USSR